AsciiDoc is a human-readable document format, semantically equivalent to DocBook XML, but using plain-text mark-up conventions. AsciiDoc documents can be created using any text editor and read “as-is”, or rendered to HTML or any other format supported by a DocBook tool-chain, i.e. PDF, TeX, Unix manpages, e-books, slide presentations, etc. Common file extensions for AsciiDoc files are txt (as encouraged by AsciiDoc's creator) and adoc.

History
AsciiDoc was created in 2002 by Stuart Rackham, who published tools (‘asciidoc’ and ‘a2x’), written in the Python programming language to convert plain-text, ‘human readable’ files to commonly used published document formats.

Asciidoctor 
A Ruby implementation called ‘Asciidoctor’, released in 2013, is in use by GitHub and GitLab. This implementation is also available in the Java ecosystem using JRuby and in the JavaScript ecosystem using Opal.js.

Some of O'Reilly Media's books and e-books are authored using AsciiDoc mark-up.

Most of the Git project documentation is written in AsciiDoc.

The AsciiDoc format is currently under standardization procedure by the Eclipse Foundation.

Example
The following shows text using AsciiDoc mark-up, and a rendering similar to that produced by an AsciiDoc processor:

Tools
 Antora – a multi-repository documentation site generator for tech writers using git.
 AsciiBinder – (deprecated) a documentation system built on Asciidoctor for people who have a lot of docs to maintain and republish on a regular basis.
 awestruct – a static site generator inspired by Jekyll.
 Asciidoc FX – AsciiDoc Book Editor based on JavaFX 8.
 AsciiDocLIVE – AsciiDocLIVE is a free online AsciiDoc editor.

See also

 Markdown
 Comparison of documentation generators
 Lightweight markup language

References

External links

 https://asciidoctor.org/
 Using AsciiDoc and Asciidoctor to write documentation - An AsciiDoc Tutorial

Free software programmed in Python
Lightweight markup languages